Bert Kerr "Hank" Waits II was an American mathematician and professor at The Ohio State University where he taught in the Mathematics Department from 1961 to 1991. He was also a consultant to Texas Instruments, Education Technology Division, and a mathematics textbook author.

In 1986 Bert Waits and Franklin Demana founded the international network Teachers Teaching with Technology (T³), followed by the annual International Conference on Technology in Collegiate Mathematics (ICTCM), and in 1993 the European biennial International Conference on Technology in Mathematics Teaching (ICTMT) 

His mantra was ’’The power of visualization’’  which he shared in over 200 invitation lectures worldwide from 1988 to 2006.

Publications (selection) 
 Precalculus: Graphical, Numerical, Algebraic, Pearson, 2010, 
 Calculus: Graphical, Numerical, Algebraic, Prentice Hall, 2021, 
 Geometry, Holt McDougal, 2011,

References 

1940 births
2014 deaths
Ohio State University alumni
20th-century American mathematicians
Textbook writers
Ohio State University faculty